Washington Hebrew Congregation (WHC) is a Reform Jewish synagogue in Washington, D.C. Washington Hebrew Congregation is currently a member of the Union for Reform Judaism. It is one of the largest Reform congregations in the United States, with 2,781 members reported on the Union for Reform Judaism database as of 2012.

History

Founding 
Washington Hebrew Congregation was the first Jewish congregation in the nation's capital, formed on April 25, 1852, when 21 German Jewish men gathered at the home of Herman Listberger on Pennsylvania Avenue near 21st Street in Washington, D.C. Solomon Pribram was elected the congregation's first president, and Capt. Jonas P. Levy, a naval commander during the Mexican-American War, made the first recorded monetary contribution. 

The congregation was growing and concerned that the opportunity to hold property did not extend to synagogues, Capt. Jonas P. Levy and other founders of the congregation submitted a petition to the 34th U. S. Congress on February 5, 1856, asking for the same rights and privileges enjoyed by Christian churches in the District. On June 2, 1856, President Franklin Pierce signed into law An Act for the Benefit of the Hebrew Congregation in the City of Washington, ensuring its right to own property in the District of Columbia. Washington Hebrew Congregation is the only Jewish house of worship in the United States to operate with an act of the U.S. Congress as its charter.

Washington Hebrew grew steadily in membership and in influence; in 1863 it purchased for $8,000.00 the 8th and I Street NW site, a former Methodist church, which had been used by the government as a hospital during the Civil War. It refurbished the building and held a grand dedication ceremony on July 31, 1863.  The building was renovated in 1877 and again in 1886 before it was ultimately torn down to make way for a new Washington Hebrew Temple on the same site.  Washington Hebrew Congregation started a religious school in 1861 and held its first confirmation class in 1871.

WHC in the Civil War 
Among the many Washington Hebrew members who fought in the Civil War, Leopold Karpeles (1838-1909) was a flagbearer for the Union Army and received the Medal of Honor in 1870 for his actions in the battles of the Wilderness and North Anna, the first Jew to be awarded the Medal of Honor.

Jewish soldiers fought on both sides in the Civil War, and the Washington Hebrew Congregation helped ease wartime suffering.  During the war, the women of the Washington Hebrew Congregation raised money for the U.S. Sanitary Commission, which administered wartime relief to soldiers and their families. The congregation’s visiting nursing corps ministered to injured Jewish soldiers. Unclaimed bodies of Jewish war dead were buried in the congregation’s cemetery.

Growth and expansion 
From 1897 to 1954, the congregation met at 816 Eighth Street NW, in a building designed by Washington architects Louis F. Stutz and Frank W. Pease. The cornerstone of this building was laid on September 16, 1897, by President William McKinley. This building was sold to New Hope Baptist Church (later Greater New Hope Baptist Church) in March 1954. Initially, men and women sat separately, with women in the gallery and men on the main floor. Traditional practices soon gave way to religious reforms, including the use of German and English during services.

When organ music was added to worship services in 1869, some members left to form an Orthodox congregation. WHC continued to thrive, however, and by 1897,  built a larger temple on the same site to serve the needs of our growing community. President William McKinley laid the cornerstone, and more than 3,000 people lined the streets to witness the event.

By 1905, the First Washington Hebrew Congregation was the only Reform congregation in the District of Columbia, with a membership of 350, and a religious school attended by 200 children.

Adas Israel Congregation, with Isaac Stampel as hazzan, was founded in 1869 by 69 members of the Washington Hebrew Congregation who objected to the Reform tendencies of the old congregation.

In 1952, President Harry S. Truman laid the cornerstone of the congregation's current home on Macomb Street NW, which was dedicated on May 6, 1955, by President Dwight D. Eisenhower.

By the 1970s, in order to meet the needs of a growing congregation and as members moved out of the District to the suburbs, an additional facility was built. The Julia Bindeman Suburban Center in Potomac, Maryland opened in 1978.

Civil Rights activities 
In the summer of 1966, a group of young Jewish activists urged the synagogue's rabbi, Rabbi Norman Gerstenfeld, to denounce a white Jewish landlord named Allie Freed for engaging in racist housing practices against African-Americans. After Rabbi Gerstenfeld refused to denounce Freed, Jewish members of ACCESS (Action Coordinating Committee to End Segregation in the Suburbs) leafleted the congregation during Yom Kippur in 1966 and 1967. They were condemned by Jason R. Silverman of the Anti-Defamation League of B'nai B'rith for protesting on Yom Kippur. In light of this, Jewish activists founded Jews for Urban Justice in order to campaign against anti-black racism within white Jewish communities.

Senior clergy

Rabbis

Louis Stern
Louis Stern came to Washington Hebrew in 1872 as “Chazen and Leader in Hebrew and Jewish Religion.” He guided the Congregation through the construction of its first building in 1897, the acquisition of a cemetery, and the development of  Reform liturgy and rituals.

Rabbi Abram Simon 

Rabbi Abram Simon came to WHC in 1904. He was a member of the Red Cross during World War I, he broadcast radio lectures, and he served as the president of D.C.’s Board of Education and the Conference of Christians and Jews. After his death, his name was given to an elementary school on Mississippi Avenue SE. Today, Temple members honor Rabbi Simon’s impact by partnering with Simon Elementary School to provide tutoring for students and resources for teachers.

Rabbi Norman Gerstenfeld 
Rabbi Norman Gerstenfeld, who initially served as Assistant Rabbi, succeeded Rabbi Simon in 1938. Rabbi Gerstenfeld was a brilliant orator, and for more than 30 years was a presence in the District’s religious life and in the national Reform movement. He also guided the construction of WHC's current home on Macomb Street NW and began a Sunday Scholar Series that continues to this day.

Rabbi Joshua O. Haberman 
Rabbi Joshua O. Haberman accepted an invitation to become senior rabbi in 1969. He reintroduced the Congregation to many of the beautiful traditions that early Reform Judaism had discarded such as initiating Torah study on Saturday mornings.  His scholarship and love of learning enhanced the spirituality of the Congregation throughout his tenure. He also nurtured a growing connection between WHC and the State of Israel and presided over the construction of the Julia Bindeman Suburban Center in Potomac, Maryland in 1976.

Rabbi Joseph P. Weinberg 
Rabbi Joseph P. Weinberg became the fifth senior rabbi in 1986. He infused creativity into every facet of the Congregation and guided both the renovation of Kaufmann Sanctuary and the creation of the Albert & Shirley Small Chapel complex. He led WHC’s involvement in Soviet Jewry, the establishment of the U.S. Holocaust Memorial Museum, and the security of the State of Israel. His call for social justice helped establish the Carrie Simon House, a transitional residence for homeless mothers and their infants. A strong advocate of civil rights and social justice, Rabbi Weinberg had marched with Martin Luther King Jr. in Selma, and after King’s death, he created an annual interfaith MLK Shabbat tradition.

Rabbi M. Bruce Lustig 
Rabbi M. Bruce Lustig became senior rabbi in 1999. Rabbi Lustig is a creator of a sense of community, a social activist who pioneered Mitzvah Day (now adopted around the country), and a caring pastor.

Rabbi Susan N. Shankman 
Rabbi Susan N. Shankman became senior rabbi in 2022, becoming the first woman to hold the position.

Cantors

Roy Garber 
Cantor Roy Garber came to Washington Hebrew Congregation, the largest Reform congregation in the Washington area, in 1977. He retired in 1989. He was born in Lynn, Mass., and received bachelor's and master's degrees from the New England Conservatory of Music. He trained as a cantor at Hebrew Union College in New York.

Before coming to Washington, he had been the first full-time cantor for congregations in Kansas City, Mo., and Milwaukee. His arrival at Washington Hebrew was seen as representing a trend toward bringing cantorial music into the services of the Reform movement.

Mikhail Manevich 
Cantor Mikhail Manevich was appointed Cantor at Washington Hebrew Congregation in 1989. During his tenure with the Congregation, Cantor Manevich has performed at all the major concert halls of Washington, D.C., including the Kennedy Center, Constitution Hall, and the National Cathedral. His voice can be heard on six solo recordings, as well as two albums of duets with Cantor Bortnick. Born in Leningrad, Cantor Manevich attended Glinka’s Choir School and received a degree in choral conducting from Leningrad State Conservatory of Music. After immigrating to the United States in 1976, he studied at the Hebrew Union College-Jewish Institute of Religion’s School of Sacred Music, where he conducted the choir. He served Temple Emanu-EI of Livingston, New Jersey as Cantor before joining Washington Hebrew Congregation.

Susan R.A. Bortnick 
Cantor Susan R.A. Bortnick joined Washington Hebrew Congregation as Cantor in 2001 and was appointed Senior Cantor in 2020.

The first cantor from Amarillo, Texas, she is a member of the American Conference of Cantors (Reform) and Cantors Assembly (Conservative). A graduate of Hebrew Union College-Jewish Institute of Religion’s Debbie Friedman School of Sacred Music, as a student cantor, she served congregations in Arnold, Maryland, and Ft. Worth, Texas. Inspired by Cantor Robert Gerber, Cantor Sharon Kohn, and Rabbi Liza Stern, Cantor Bortnick pursued cantorial studies after receiving a bachelor’s degree in business administration with a concentration in finance from the University of Texas, Austin.

She has recorded two albums with Cantor Manevich, now WHC’s Cantor Emeritus: “Together,” their favorite duets, and “Shirei Shabbat,” a recording of their innovative Shabbat service.

Facilities 
Washington Hebrew Congregation owns two buildings in the Washington, D.C. area and partners with other Jewish organizations on others.

Macomb St. Temple 
In 1952, President Harry S. Truman laid the cornerstone of the congregation's current home on Macomb Street NW, which was dedicated on May 6, 1955, by President Dwight D. Eisenhower. Expanded and renovated over the years, the Temple is nestled in between Rock Creek National Park and the residential neighborhood of McLean Gardens. In addition to multiple worship spaces, the building houses a Religious School, Edlavitch-Tyser Early Childhood Center, and several social halls and meeting spaces.

Julia Bindeman Suburban Center 
Dedicated in 1978, the Julia Bindeman Suburban Center was erected to meet the needs of a growing congregation, as members moved out of the District to the suburbs. The building houses the Rabbi Joseph P. Weinberg Early Childhood Center and the Temple Religious School. In addition, many Temple auxiliaries hold social and educational programs at the facility. The building also has social halls and reception areas available for rental.

Washington Hebrew Congregation Memorial Park 
Washington Hebrew Congregation made a cemetery a first priority. It purchased a small plot on Hamilton Road (now Alabama Avenue, SE) in the early 1850s, before moving to an area adjacent to Adas Israel’s land in 1879.

Garden of Remembrance (Gan Zikaron) Memorial Park 
Washington Hebrew Congregation organized a 152-acre nonprofit cemetery, Garden of Remembrance (Gan Zikaron) Memorial Park, in Clarksburg, Maryland. It opened for use by the entire Washington area Jewish community in 2000.

Early Childhood Center sexual abuse allegations
In August 2018 the synagogue reported to community parents that it had learned of, and taken actions in response to, allegations that an employee at its Macomb Street Edlavitch-Tyser Early Childhood Center may have engaged in inappropriate conduct involving one or more children. According to a January 2020 report, the alleged victims were 14 or 15 children, ages two to four. The teacher who was accused of abuse (who is named in some news reports, not others) had been hired by the preschool in March 2016, and was placed on administrative leave in August 2016 and fired in October 2018.

The D.C. Metropolitan Police and the U.S. Attorney for the District of Columbia concluded a 16-month criminal investigation of the alleged abuser in January 2020, closing the case without filing any charges. A police statement explained that "after exhausting all investigative avenues, the universal determination of the investigative team was that there was insufficient probable cause to establish that an offense occurred or to make an arrest."

In contrast, the D.C. Office of the State Superintendent of Education stated, in a June 2019 cease-and desist letter to the congregation as reported by CNN, that it found that "more than one child was a victim of sexual abuse by the alleged maltreator." The office determined that the preschool failed to ensure the safety of children under its care, failed to properly supervise children, and failed to comply with reporting requirements.

The D.C. Attorney General's Office was also reportedly investigating the allegations.

In April 2019, some parents of alleged victims filed a civil lawsuit against the congregation and Deborah “DJ” Schneider Jensen, head of school for early childhood education, alleging that they were negligent amid “systemic, regular sexual abuse.” Jensen was placed on administrative leave in April 2019, and subsequently left the center. According to a February 2020 report, that case was scheduled to go to trial in early 2021. Another group of parents filed a separate civil lawsuit in May 2019.

Antisemitic graffiti
In October 2019 the synagogue was vandalized with graffiti including, according to the police report, “numerous anti-Semitic statements, profane language, and child-like drawings of male and female genitalia.”  This incident was one among several antisemitic hate crimes targeting that synagogue, as well as others in the region.

References

Bibliography

Jewish Encyclopedia article on Washington D.C. congregations
Raphael, Marc Lee. Towards a "national shrine": a centennial history of Washington Hebrew Congregation 1855-1955 (Williamsburg, Va.: Dept. of Religious Studies, College of William and Mary, 2005); no ISBN.

External links

Washington Hebrew Congregation history
Washington Hebrew Congregation history (old version, cached)

1852 establishments in Washington, D.C.
Ashkenazi Jewish culture in Washington, D.C.
Classical Reform Judaism
German-Jewish culture in the United States
Reform synagogues in Washington, D.C.
Religious organizations established in 1852
Synagogues in Washington, D.C.
Child sexual abuse in the United States